D119 may refer to:
 D119 road (Croatia), a state road on island of Lastovo
 HMS Delight (D119), a British Royal Navy ship
 Jodel D.119, an aircraft